The Isle of Wight is one of the richest dinosaur localities in Europe, with over 20 species of dinosaur having been recognised from the early Cretaceous Period (in particular between 132 and 110 million years ago), some of which were first identified on the island, as well as the contemporary non-dinosaurian species of crocodile, turtle and pterosaur.

Compton Bay, near Freshwater features dinosaur footprints which are visible at low tide.

Geological strata 

The Isle of Wight has layers of the Vectis and Wealden fossil-bearing beds exposed on the southern half of the island. These are revealed in the cliffs of Yaverland, close to Sandown, and at Hanover Point and Whale Chine, along the southwestern coast.

The Cretaceous habitat 

The island's dinosaurs come from the Wessex Formation, which dates from between 125 and 110 million years ago (mya). During this time the Isle of Wight, then located on a latitude at which North Africa resides today, had a subtropical environment and was part of a large river valley complex, which ran along the south coast of England to Belgium. It was a world of ponds, rivers and swamps, so it had conditions favourable for the formation of fossils.

Animal remains from this time include crocodiles, turtles, pterosaurs, mammals and possibly some birds. In the water were snails, fish and mussels.

As this environment did not change much, over the course of 10 million years, a large number of fossils were formed, so the island today is a very rich source.

List of dinosaur species and genera 

Unless otherwise specified, the following is a list of dinosaurs for which almost complete skeletons have been found on the island. There are also many more species, known only from a single or very few bones.

Order Ornithischia 

 Suborder Ornithopoda ("bird-footed", bipedal herbivores)
 Iguanodon bernissartensis
 Brighstoneus simmondsi, partial skeleton with skull and lower jaw
 Mantellisaurus atherfieldensis 
 Valdosaurus canaliculatus (known from partial material)
 Hypsilophodon foxii: Named after Rev. William Fox, a fossil collector of the Isle of Wight who found several skeletons.
 Suborder Thyreophora ("shield-bearers", armored herbivorous dinosaurs)
 Polacanthus foxii: Also named after the Reverend Fox. Notable as no head to the specimen has ever been found and reconstructions are based upon suppositions from similar ankylosaurians.
 Spearpoint Ankylosaur

Order Saurischia 

 Suborder Sauropodomorpha ("sauropod-like", giant long-necked herbivores)
 The 'Barnes High' sauropod: A member of the Brachiosauridae family, most likely Eucamerotus or Pelorosaurus, in the collection of Dinosaur Farm. This is the most complete specimen from the Wealden era "including presacral vertebrae, anterior caudal vertebrae, girdle and limb elements".
 Iuticosaurus valdensis
 Oplosaurus armatus, a single tooth
 Ornithopsis hulkei, posterior dorsal vertebra, a right pubis and ischium
 Chondrosteosaurus gigas, two neck vertebrae
 Eucamerotus foxi, vertebrae found in 1852

 Suborder Theropoda ("beast foot", bipedal carnivores)
 Aristosuchus pusillus, a compsognathid
 Baryonyx walkeri: Teeth are common on the Island. Hand bones have also been found.
 Ceratosuchops inferodios
 Eotyrannus lengi: A tyrannosauroid. First identified in 1997 and named in 2001 from a single specimen found on the island.
 Neovenator salerii: The holotype skeleton was found on the island in 1978 but not described until 1996.
 Riparovenator milnerae
 Thecocoelurus daviesi, partial vertebrae
 Vectiraptor greeni, two partial dorsal vertebrae and parts of the sacrum found in 2003 and described in 2021. 
 Vectaerovenator inopinatus, found in 2019 from 4 vertebrae and named in 2020.
 Yaverlandia bitholus: The holotype partial skull was found at Yaverland. It was initially believed to have belonged to a pachycephalosaurian.

See also 

 List of dinosaur finds in the United Kingdom

References

Deborah Cadbury, The Dinosaur Hunters (Fourth Estate) ; a history of the early history of the discovery of dinosaurs in the United Kingdom. Includes brief references to collectors on the island.

External links
Dinosaurs at Dinosaur Isle The website of Dinosaur Isle, an Isle of Wight palaeontological museum.
DinoWight - The Dinosaurs of the Isle of Wight Good site for general and scientific information
Dinosaur Attractions Dinosaur Visitor attractions and things to do on the Isle of Wight
The Palaeontological Association - Official website.
"New Species Of Prehistoric Creatures Discovered In Isle Of Wight Mud", ScienceDaily, February 2009 news item on the discovery of diverse 48 species.

Other meanings

Dinosaurs of the Isle of Wight (Palaeontological Association, 2001) , is also the title of a field guide to dinosaurs found on the island, by Darren Naish and David Martill.

Environment of the Isle of Wight
History of the Isle of Wight
 
Extinct animals of Europe
Fossils of England
Geology of the Isle of Wight